The 2019 Pittsburgh Riverhounds SC season is the club's twentieth season of existence, their second consecutive season in the second tier of American soccer, and their ninth season in the league now named the USL Championship. The season covers the period from October 21, 2018 to the beginning of the 2020 USL Championship season. Bob Lilley returns for his second season as Riverhounds manager.

Roster

Non-competitive

Preseason
The Riverhounds released their preseason schedule on January 18, 2019. The club played nine games in just over a month, with six coming against collegiate programs, one against a fellow USL Championship club, and two against clubs from USL League One. All nine games were played in Pittsburgh, with eight taking place at Highmark Stadium.

Competitive

USL Championship

Standings

Results by round

Match results
On December 14, 2018, the league announced the home openers for every club. Pittsburgh's home opener at Highmark Stadium will be played on April 13, as the six-year anniversary of the stadium's opening will be marked with a game against expansion club Hartford Athletic. The Riverhounds will also take part in the home opening matches for two other clubs, facing Tampa Bay Rowdies on March 16 and Swope Park Rangers on March 23.

The full Riverhounds schedule was released on December 19, 2018. The season will once again consist of 34 matches, with home and away matches against each Eastern Conference opponent. The Riverhounds will face league newcomers Birmingham Legion FC, Hartford Athletic, Loudoun United FC, and Memphis 901 FC for the first time ever, and will renew their series with Saint Louis FC and Swope Park Rangers as those two clubs move back over from the Western Conference.

USL Cup Playoffs

U.S. Open Cup

As a member of the USL Championship, the Riverhounds entered the tournament in the Second Round, to be played May 14, 2019.

Statistics

Appearances and goals

|-
|colspan=10 align=center|Players who left Pittsburgh during the season:

|}

Disciplinary record

Clean sheets

Transfers

In

Loan in

Out

Awards

Kits

See also
 Pittsburgh Riverhounds SC
 2019 in American soccer
 2019 USL Championship season

References

Pittsburgh Riverhounds SC seasons
Pittsburgh Riverhounds SC
Pittsburgh Riverhounds SC
Pittsburgh Riverhounds SC